William Marmon Quao Halm (born 24 July 1902) was a Ghanaian economist. He was a governor of the Bank of Ghana from 5 October 1962 to 13 August 1965. He was born in Akuse. From 1959 to 1962 ambassador of Ghana to the USA.

References

 

1902 births
Year of death missing
20th-century deaths
20th-century Ghanaian economists
Governors of Bank of Ghana
People from Eastern Region (Ghana)